Blue Division Medal may refer to:
 Blue Division Medal (Germany)
 Medalla de la Campaña de Rusia